Earl of Callendar was a title in the Peerage of Scotland. It was created in 1641 for James Livingston, 1st Lord Livingston of Almond, a younger son of Alexander Livingston, 1st Earl of Linlithgow, along with the subsidiary title Lord Livingston and Almond. The 4th Earl later inherited the more senior Earldom of Linlithgow from his uncle, with which title the Earldom of Callendar was merged until its forfeiture by attainder in 1716. The seat of the Earls of Callendar was Callendar House in Falkirk.

Lords Livingston of Almond (1633–1716)
James Livingston, 1st Lord Livingston of Almond (d. 1674) (created Earl of Callendar in 1641)

Earls of Callendar (1641–1716)
James Livingston, 1st Earl of Callendar (d. 1674)
Alexander Livingston, 2nd Earl of Callendar (d. 1685)
Alexander Livingston, 3rd Earl of Callendar (d. 1692)
James Livingston, 4th Earl of Callendar (d. 1723) (became 5th Earl of Linlithgow in 1695, attainted 1716)

Notes and references

External links
 Cracroft's Peerage page

Forfeited earldoms in the Peerage of Scotland
Noble titles created in 1641